Staraya Mayna is an urban locality (an urban-type settlement) in Staromaynsky District of Ulyanovsk Oblast, Russia. Population:

History

The archaeological expedition headed by Alexander Kozhevin from Ulyanovsk State University concluded that the site has been continuously inhabited since the 4th century CE. The oldest recovered objects date around 20,000 years old. Staraya Mayna existed as part of the Imenkovo culture. It was later taken by the Volga Bulgars, after that the Golden Horde and then the Kazan Khanate. In the 17th century, the first settlement under the Russian Empire was established. Gothic pendants of 3rd century, a Romantic coin of the emperor Caracalla dated 213 CE, 4th century belts were discovered in excavations. The consensus among historians is that the Imenkovo culture was formed by the Rus' people who later migrated to establish the Kievan Rus. In 2007, an idol of the Hindu deity Vishnu, dated to the 7th–10th century AD, was excavated from Staraya Mayna.

References

Urban-type settlements in Ulyanovsk Oblast